Merryman II (foaled 1951) was a Scottish-bred Thoroughbred racehorse who competed in National Hunt racing.

He is best known for winning the 1960 Grand National at odds of 13/2, making him the first clear favourite to win for 33 years as well as the first Scottish-bred winner.

His jockey, 22-year-old Gerry Scott, had been lucky to take part in the race, having broken his collarbone two weeks prior.

Due to the 1960 race being the first ever televised, Merryman II also holds the distinction of being the first televised winner of a Grand National.

Grand National record

Pedigree

References

1951 racehorse births
Racehorses bred in the United Kingdom
Racehorses trained in the United Kingdom
Grand National winners